Tuman or Tumen may refer to:
 Tumen River, a river between China and North Korea
 Tuman River, a river in Shufu County, Xinjiang, China
 Tuman (Soviet patrol boat), a 1931 Soviet World War II warship
 Tuman bay II (died 1517), medieval Egyptian sultan
 Tuman monastery, a monastery in eastern Serbia
 Tuman Tumanian (1879–1906), participant of the Armenian national liberation movement
 Tuman (album), by Sofia Rotaru
 "Tuman" (song), by the Russian band Kommunizm

See also 
 Iranian toman, an Iranian currency
 Teoman, a Turkish given name used for Touman, leader of a nomadic tribe in Asia
 Tuman bay (disambiguation)
 Tumandar, a title given to the leader of a Baloch or Pashtoon tribe in Pakistan
 Tumen (disambiguation)
 Tyumen, a city in Russia